Carripook railway station was located on the Adelaide-Wolseley line serving the Adelaide Hills suburb of Bridgewater to the east of the Kain Avenue level crossing.

History 

It is unclear when Carripook station was opened. It consisted of one 67 metre platform with a waiting shelter.

The station closed on 23 September 1987, when the State Transport Authority withdrew Bridgewater line services between Belair and Bridgewater. It was probably demolished around 1995 when the railway line was converted from broad to standard gauge.

References

 South Australian Railways Working Timetable Book No. 265 effective 10:00am, Sunday, 30 June 1974.

Disused railway stations in South Australia
Railway stations closed in 1987
1987 disestablishments in Australia